Patrik Kaminský (born 27 October 1978 in Prešov) is a professional Slovak football defender who currently plays for the 3. liga club FC Lokomotíva Košice.

Career statistics

Last updated: 28 December 2009

External links
 Player profile at mfkkosice.sk

Living people
1978 births
Slovak footballers
FC Steel Trans Ličartovce players
FC VSS Košice players
FK Bodva Moldava nad Bodvou players
FC Lokomotíva Košice players
Slovak Super Liga players
Association football central defenders
Sportspeople from Prešov